The 71st annual Venice International Film Festival took place in Venice, Italy between 27 August to 6 September 2014. The festival opened with Alejandro G. Iñárritu's film Birdman, and closed with Ann Hui's drama film The Golden Era. Italian actress Luisa Ranieri hosted the opening and closing nights of the festival. The Swedish film A Pigeon Sat on a Branch Reflecting on Existence, directed by Roy Andersson, won the Golden Lion, and Joshua Oppenheimer's The Look of Silence won the Grand Jury Prize.

American filmmakers Thelma Schoonmaker and Frederick Wiseman were the recipients of the Lifetime Achievement award. French composer Alexandre Desplat was the head of the jury for the main competition section.

The festival poster paid tribute to François Truffaut, as it featured the character of Antoine Doinel portrayed by Jean-Pierre Léaud from Truffaut's 1959 drama film The 400 Blows.

Juries
Main Competition (Venezia 71)
Alexandre Desplat: French composer (President of Jury)
Joan Chen: Chinese actress and director
Philip Gröning: German director
Jessica Hausner: Austrian director
Jhumpa Lahiri: Indian novelist
Sandy Powell: English costume designer  
Tim Roth: British actor 
Elia Suleiman: Palestinian director
Carlo Verdone: Italian actor and director

Horizons (Orizzonti)
Ann Hui: Hong Kong director (President of Jury)
Moran Atias: Israeli actress
Pernilla August: Swedish actress and director
David Chase: American writer and director 
Mahamat-Saleh Haroun: Chadian director 
 Roberto Minervini: Italian director
 Alin Taşçıyan: Turkish critic

Opera Prima (Venice Award for a Debut Film)
Alice Rohrwacher: Italian director (President of Jury)
Lisandro Alonso: Argentine director
Ron Mann: Canadian filmmaker
Vivian Qu: Chinese filmmaker
Răzvan Rădulescu: Romanian novelist and film director

Official selection

In Competition
The following films were selected for the main competition:

Highlighted title indicates the Golden Lion winner.

Out of Competition
The following films were selected to be screened out of competition:

Horizons
The following films were selected for the Horizons (Orizzonti) section:

Highlighted titles indicate the Orizzonti Awards for Best Feature Film and Best Short Film respectively.

Venice Classics
The following selection of restored classic films and documentaries on cinema were screened for this section:

Highlighted titles indicate the Best Restored Film and Best Documentary on Cinema official awards respectively.

Biennale College - Cinema
The following films were screened for the "Biennale College - Cinema" section, a higher education training workshop for micro-budget feature films:

Final Cut in Venice
The following films were screened for the "Final Cut in Venice" section, a workshop to support the post-production of films from Africa:

Special Screenings
The following films were the Special Screenings of the Official Selection:
 9x10 novanta, by various Italian directors. A film composed of footages from the Luce Archives, to celebrate the 90th anniversary of the Luce Institute. It was presented in collaboration with Venice Days (see also section below).
 Taipei Factory II by Hou Chi-Jan, Cho Li, and Hsieh Chun-Yi (Chinese Taipei)

Autonomous sections

International Critics’ Week
The following films were selected for the 29th Venice International Film Critics' Week:

Venice Days
The following films were selected for the 11th edition of the Venice Days (Giornate degli Autori) section:

Highlighted title indicates the official Venice Days Award winner.

Awards

Official selection
The following official awards were presented at the 71st edition:

In Competition (Venezia 71)
Golden Lion: A Pigeon Sat on a Branch Reflecting on Existence by Roy Andersson
Silver Lion for Best Director: Andrei Konchalovsky for The Postman's White Nights
Grand Jury Prize: The Look of Silence by Joshua Oppenheimer
Volpi Cup for Best Actor: Adam Driver for Hungry Hearts
Volpi Cup for Best Actress: Alba Rohrwacher for Hungry Hearts
Marcello Mastroianni Award: Romain Paul for his role in The Last Hammer Blow
 Best Screenplay Award: Rakhshan Banietemad & Farid Mostafavi for  Tales
Special Jury Prize: Sivas by Kaan Mujdeci

Horizons (Orizzonti) 
Best Film: Court by Chaitanya Tamhane
Best Director: Theeb by Naji Abu Nowar
Special Jury Prize: Belluscone, una storia siciliana by Franco Maresco
Special Award for Best Actor or Actress: Emir Hadžihafizbegović for These Are the Rules
Horizons Award for Best Short Film: Maryam by Sidi Saleh

Lion of the Future
Luigi De Laurentiis Award for a Debut Film: Court by Chaitanya Tamhane (Horizons)

Venice Classics Awards
Best Restored Film: A Special Day (Una giornata particolare) by Ettore Scola
Best Documentary on Cinema: Animata Resistenza by Francesco Montagner and Alberto Girotto

Special Awards
Golden Lion for Lifetime Achievement: Thelma Schoonmaker and Frederick Wiseman
Persol Tribute to Visionary Talent Award: Frances McDormand
Jaeger-LeCoultre Glory to the Filmmaker Award: James Franco;
L’Oréal Paris per il Cinema Award: Valentina Corti

Autonomous sections
The following official and collateral awards were conferred to films of the autonomous sections:

29th Venice International Critics' Week 
 RaroVideo Audience Award for Best Film: No One's Child by Vuk Ršumović
 FEDEORA (Federation of Film Critics of Europe and the Mediterranean) Best Screenplay: No One's Child by Vuk Ršumović
 FEDEORA Best Film: Flapping in The Middle of Nowhere by Nguyễn Hoàng Điệp
 FIPRESCI Awards - Best Film (Critics' Week): No One's Child (Nicije dete) by Vuk Ršumović
 "Civitas Vitae prossima" Award: Ivan Gergolet (director) for Dancing with Maria

Venice Days (Giornate degli Autori)     
 Venice Days Award: Return to Ithaca by Laurent Cantet
 BNL People's Choice Award: The Farewell Party by  Tal Granit and Sharon Maymon
 Europa Cinemas Label Award for Best European Film: The Dinner by  Ivano De Matteo
 Fedeora Awards:
Best Film: One on One by Kim Ki-duk
Best director of a debut film: Aditya Vikram Sengupta for Labour of Love
 Brian Award - UAAR: The Farewell Party (Mita Tova) by Tal Granit and Sharon Maymon
 Queer Lion Award 2014: Summer Nights (Les nuits d’été) by Mario Fanfani
 Gillo Pontecorvo Arcobaleno Latino Award: The Show MAS Go On by Rä di Martino
 Cinecibo Award: The Dinner by  Ivano De Matteo
 Pasinetti Special Award: The Dinner by Ivano De Matteo
 Open Award: Rä di Martino for The Show MAS Go On
 Akai International Film Festival Prize for Best Actor: Jacopo Olmo Antinori for The Dinner

Other collateral awards
The following collateral awards were conferred to films of the official selection:
 FIPRESCI Awards - Best Film (Main competition): The Look of Silence by Joshua Oppenheimer
 SIGNIS Award: Far from Men (Loin des hommes) by David Oelhoffen
Special mention 99 Homes by Ramin Bahrani
 Francesco Pasinetti (SNGCI) Award:
Best Film: Black Souls (Anime nere) by  Francesco Munzi
Best Actor: Elio Germano for Leopardi 
Best Actress: Alba Rohrwacher for Hungry Hearts
Special Award: Saverio Costanzo (director) for Hungry Hearts
Special Award: Pierfrancesco Favino (actor) for Without Pity (Horizons)
 Leoncino d'Oro Agiscuola Award: Birdman by Alejándro G. Iñárritu
Cinema for UNICEF mention: Hungry Hearts by Saverio Costanzo
 Arca CinemaGiovani Award:
Best Film of Venezia 71: Far from Men by David Oelhoffen
Best Italian film: Belluscone: A Sicilian Story (Belluscone. Una storia siciliana) by Franco Maresco (Horizons)
 CICAE - Cinema d’Arte e d’Essai Award: Heaven Knows What by Josh and Ben Safdie (Horizons)
 Fedeora Award for Best Euro-Mediterranean film: The Look of Silence by Joshua Oppenheimer
 FEDIC Award: On the Bride's Side (Io sto con la sposa) by Antonio Augugliaro, Gabriele Del Grande, Khaled Soliman Al Nassiry (Horizons)
Special mention: Italy in a Day by Gabriele Salvatores
 Fondazione Mimmo Rotella Award: Luigi Musini (producer) for Black Souls
 Future Film Festival Digital Award: Birdman by Alejandro González Iñárritu
Special mention: Italy in a day by Gabriele Salvatores
 P. Nazareno Taddei Award: Birdman by Alejandro González Iñárritu
 Lanterna Magica (CGS) Award: The Last Hammer Blow (Le dernier coup de marteau) by Alix Delaporte
 Golden Mouse: The Look of Silence by Joshua Oppenheimer
 Silver Mouse: Olive Kitteridge by Lisa Cholodenko (Out of competition)
 The Most Innovative Budget: Italy in a Day by Gabriele Salvatores
 Interfilm Award for Promoting Interreligious Dialogue: Far from Men by David Oelhoffen
 Young Jury Members of the Vittorio Veneto Film Festival:
Best film: 99 Homes by Ramin Bahrani
Best actor: Elio Germano (actor) for Leopardi
Special mention: Fatih Akin (director) for The Cut
 Green Drop Award: The Postman's White Nights (Belye nochi pochtalona Alekseya Tryapitsyna) by Andrei Konchalovsky
 Soundtrack Stars Award
Critic's Choice Award: Alexandre Desplat (President of Venezia 71 Jury)
Best Soundtrack Award: Birdman by Alejandro González Iñárritu
 Schermi di Qualità Award – Carlo Mazzacurati: Black Souls by Francesco Munzi
 Human Rights Nights Award:
On the Bride's Side by Antonio Augugliaro, Gabriele Del Grande, Khaled Soliman Al Nassiry
The Look of Silence by Joshua Oppenheimer
 Piccioni Award: soundtrack of Leopardi (music by Sascha Ring)
 AssoMusica “Ho visto una Canzone” Award: song Just One Day, from the film Italy in a day
 "Sorriso diverso Venezia 2014" Award: On the Bride's Side by Antonio Augugliaro, Gabriele Del Grande, Khaled Soliman Al Nassiry
 1st Akai International Film Festival
Best Rivelation: Xin Yukun for  The Coffin in the Mountain  
Best Direction: Francesco Munzi for Black Souls
Best Actress: Iaia Forte for Leopardi, The Show MAS Go On & La vita oscena

References

External links

Venice Film Festival 2014 Awards on IMDb

Venice Film Festival
Venice Film Festival
Venice Film Festival
Venice Film Festival
Film
August 2014 events in Italy
September 2014 events in Italy